Ida Blom (20 January 1931, in Gentofte – 26 November 2016) was a Norwegian historian.

She graduated from the University of Bergen in 1961, and then took her doctorate there in 1972 while working as a research assistant. She was a professor in women's history at the University of Bergen from 1985 to 2001, and later a professor emeritus at the same school.

She was a member of the Norwegian Academy of Science and Letters. She was awarded the Gina Krog Prize in 2009.

Selected bibliography
Nasjonal reisning: pressgruppepolitikk i Grønlandsspørsmålet 1921-31, 1972
Kjønnsroller og likestilling, 1983
"Den haarde dyst": Fødsler og fødselshjelp gjennom 150 år, 1988
Det er forskjell på folk - nå som før, 1994 
Cappelens kvinnehistorie (ed.), 1992
This book received the Brage Prize

References

University of Bergen

1931 births
2016 deaths
20th-century Norwegian historians
University of Bergen alumni
Academic staff of the University of Bergen
Members of the Norwegian Academy of Science and Letters
Norwegian women academics
People from Gentofte Municipality
Norwegian women historians